The Walking Dead: Dead City is an upcoming American post-apocalyptic horror drama television series created by Eli Jorné, based on The Walking Dead characters Maggie and Negan. It is fourth spin-off and overall fifth series in The Walking Dead franchise, sharing continuity with the other television series, and the first sequel to The Walking Dead TV series. Jorné serves as showrunner.

Lauren Cohan and Jeffrey Dean Morgan reprise their roles as Maggie and Negan from the original television series, along with Gaius Charles, Jonathan Higginbotham, Mahina Napoleon, Trey Santiago-Hudson, and Charlie Solis also starring. Development of the series began in March 2022. The title of the series was revealed at the same time before being renamed later that August. Additional castings were revealed in October and November 2022. Filming began in New York City by July and concluded October 2022.

The Walking Dead: Dead City is scheduled to premiere in June 2023 and will consist of six episodes.

Premise 
The series follows Maggie and Negan traveling into a post-apocalyptic Manhattan cut off from the mainland in search of Maggie's kidnapped son, Hershel. The crumbling city is filled with the dead and denizens who have made New York City their own world full of anarchy, danger, beauty, and terror.

Cast and characters 
 Lauren Cohan as Maggie Greene: Glenn's widow and the former leader of the Hilltop.
 Jeffrey Dean Morgan as Negan: The reformed former leader of the Saviors.
 Gaius Charles as Perlie Armstrong: A devoted family man.
 Željko Ivanek as "The Croat"
 Jonathan Higginbotham as Tommaso
 Mahina Napoleon as Ginny
 Trey Santiago-Hudson as Jano
 Charlie Solis as "The Bartender"
 Michael Anthony as Luther

Alex Borlo, David Chen, Randy Gonzalez, Alex Huynh, Aixa Kendrick, Karina Ortiz, Caleb Reese Paul, Eleanor Reissa, and John Wu have been cast in undisclosed roles. Maggie's son Hershel Rhee will also appear, however it is unclear who will portray him.

Episodes 

The following episodes were written by Eli Jorné, Keith Staskiewicz, Eli Jorné, Brenna Kouf, and Eli Jorné, respectively.

Production

Development 
In March 2022, AMC reported that they were developing a fourth spin-off of The Walking Dead titled Isle of the Dead revolving around Maggie and Negan with Lauren Cohan and Jeffrey Dean Morgan reprising their respective roles from the original series and Eli Jorné, a writer and co-executive producer on The Walking Dead, attached as showrunner alongside Cohan and Morgan as executive producers. In late August, the series title was renamed to The Walking Dead: Dead City.

Casting 
In April 2022, Gaius Charles was cast as Perlie Armstrong. In July, Željko Ivanek, Jonathan Higginbotham, and Mahina Napoleon were cast as "The Croat", Tommaso, and Ginny respectively.

Filming 
Principal photography began on July 19 in New Jersey and wrapped on October 24, 2022. Locations include the Meadowlands Arena, Franklin Lakes Nature Preserve, Port Newark, National Newark Building, Newark Symphony Hall, Hoboken Terminal, Liberty State Park and Shades of Death Road.

Marketing 
In November 2022, an early look on the behind the scenes of the series was released by AMC.

Release 
The Walking Dead: Dead City is expected to premiere on AMC in June 2023.

References

External links
 

 
The Walking Dead (franchise) television series

2020s American drama television series
2020s American horror television series
AMC (TV channel) original programming
American horror fiction television series
English-language television shows
Horror drama television series
Post-apocalyptic television series
Serial drama television series
Television shows based on comics
Television series about viral outbreaks
Television series based on Image Comics
Television shows filmed in New Jersey
Television shows filmed in New York (state)
Television shows set in Manhattan
Zombies in television
Upcoming drama television series